John S. Batiuk (March 20, 1923 – August 1, 2005) was a municipal and provincial level politician from Alberta, Canada. He served as a member of the Legislative Assembly of Alberta from 1971 to 1986. Batiuk sat with the governing Progressive Conservative caucus.

Political career
Batiuk began his political career in 1968 when he ran for a seat on the newly created Municipal District of Lamont No, 82. He represented Division 1 until 1974.

Batiuk moved to provincial politics running for a seat to the Alberta Legislature for the first time in the 1971 Alberta general election. He defeated incumbent Alex Gordey to win the redistributed electoral district of Vegreville and pick it up for the Progressive Conservatives who had formed government for the first time in that election. Despite winning provincial office Batiuk did not give up his municipal seat until his term expired.

Batiuk won a slightly higher popular vote running for a second term in the 1975 Alberta general election. He was re-elected to his third term in office in the 1979 general election winning a slightly higher popular vote. The election was still closely contested with the NDP who won also won a close second in 1975.

Batiuk won his fourth and final term in the 1982 general election. He retired from provincial politics at the dissolution of the legislature in 1986.

References

External links
Legislative Assembly of Alberta Members Listing

Progressive Conservative Association of Alberta MLAs
Alberta municipal councillors
2005 deaths
1923 births
People from Lamont County